Giovanni Laurentini (also called Arrigoni, active around 1600) was an Italian painter. He was a pupil of Federigo Barocci. Born in Rimini, he mostly executed large canvases including  The Martyrdom of St. John as the main altarpiece for Sant'Agostino, and St. John, St. Bernardine of Siena for the Frati Minori church of San Bernardino, and St. Paul for San Paolo, Rimini.

References
Federico Fellini, Mario Guaraldi, Loris Pellegrini: la mia Rimini, 2003, p. 31

17th-century Italian painters
Italian male painters
Italian Baroque painters
People from Rimini